The 1988 Speedway World Team Cup was the 29th edition of the FIM Speedway World Team Cup to determine the team world champions.

The three legged final format was scrapped and a one off final returned, which was held at the Veterans Memorial Stadium (Long Beach) in California, United States. It made no difference to Denmark who duly wrapped up a sixth consecutive title (and eighth in total) moving level with England's record. It was also Hans Nielsen's eighth gold medal having taken part in all of Denmark's title wins.

Qualification

Group D
 April 10, 1988
  Wiener Neustadt

 Austria to Group C

Group C
Calendar

Round 1
 June 26, 1988
  Szeged

Round 2
 July 3, 1988
  Lonigo

 Hungary to Group B

Group B
 August 12, 1988
  Landshut

West Germany to Group A

Group A

Round 1

 August 21, 1988
  Prague

Round 2

 August 25, 1988
  Linköping

 Sweden to Final

World Final
 September 10, 1988
  Long Beach, Veterans Memorial Stadium

See also
 1988 Individual Speedway World Championship
 1988 Speedway World Pairs Championship

References

Speedway World Team Cup
1988 in speedway